John Both may refer to:

 Jan Dirksz Both (c. 1610–1652), Dutch painter, draughtsman, and etcher
 John Both de Bajna (died 1493), Hungarian nobleman